The  is a large family car which was produced by the Japanese automaker Nissan from 1990 to 2007, for the markets in Japan and Europe. In Japan, it replaced the Auster/Stanza, and was exclusive to Nissan Prince Store locations. In North America, it was the entry level luxury sports sedan for the Infiniti brand. The word "primera" in Spanish means "first", in its female form.

First generation (P10; 1990) 

Since 1986, Nissan had been building Bluebirds — essentially a rebadged home market Auster/Stanza – for the market in Europe at its factory in Washington, Tyne and Wear, England. Nissan showcased the Primera X concept car at the 1989 Tokyo Motor Show as part of Project 901 (Nissan's performance vision for 1990), and concept car UV.X at the 1989 Frankfurt Motor Show. The design was specifically targeted at European buyers.

Having originally launched in Japan in February 1990, Nissan replaced the United Kingdom's Bluebird with the slightly smaller Primera in September that year. It had a conventional front wheel drive chassis and five speed manual gearbox, with some versions getting the option of a four speed automatic.

Power came from 1.6-litre carbureted (not available in Japan, except in the Avenir Cargo van version) and 1.8-litre and 2.0-litre injection petrol engines. In Europe, a 2.0-litre diesel followed from 1992 onwards, while a 1.6-litre injection gasoline was introduced at the end of 1993. The 1.8 was originally a single point injection model (SR18Di); a multi point injection with more power was added in 1991.

The 1.8-litre version was not built with left-hand drive and was not sold in continental Europe. Bodystyles were four- and five-door saloons. A five-door estate was also offered as the Primera Traveller; however, it was based on the slightly different sheet metal of the Nissan Avenir and was only made in Japan. With the exception of the UK GT, only the four-door model was available in Japan.

The Primera saw Nissan's multi link front suspension applied to front-wheel drive for the first time. The 2.0-litre gasoline engine received a power upgrade in 1992, which gave the then ZXe (later renamed the eGT) 150 bhp from the standard 2.0-litre engine and a top speed of around 219 km/h (137 mph).

Some five-door, British made, RHD Primeras were exported back to Japan where they were sold under the name of Primera UK GT. In the United States, cars built in Japan was rebadged as the Infiniti G20, part of Nissan's upper scale Infiniti brand.

Trim levels (Europe)
The Primera range came in six trim levels at launch: L, LS, SLX, GS, GSX and ZX. The 1.6-litre engine was available in L, LS and LSX trim and the 2.0-litre  engine was available in LS, GS and GSX trim. The ZX model had a 2.0-litre  engine. From 1992 onwards, the range was facelifted and new L, LX, SLX, SGX and eGT trim levels replaced the original naming scheme. A 2.0-litre diesel version was available from 1992.

The L cars were basic, and had 1.6-litre petrol engines only. The LX was slightly plusher, but 2.0-litre petrol and diesel versions were also available. SLX was the mid range model, and these also had a choice of 1.6 and 2.0 petrol, or 2.0 diesel engines. The SGX trim level was the luxury specification version; powered by the 2.0-litre  engine.

The eGT was the sporting version, with a 2.0-litre  engine. Engine power was slightly increased during 1994, with the 1.6 model producing  and the 2.0 model, .

From 1994, the range received another facelift, and the trim levels were almost the same; although Equation replaced the basic L as the entry level trim; like its predecessor, it had a 1.6 petrol engine, but there was no diesel option. At this time, the SE replaced the SGX.

A new "warm hatch" version, the SRi, joined the line up from 1994. This had a choice of 1.6- or 2.0-litre petrol engines. For the domestic Japanese market there was also a very rare version of the P10 built and tuned by Japanese tuning company Autech: these models came with special Autech suspension and interior packages and a tuned SR20DE 2.0-litre engine making .

Second generation (P11; 1996)

The second generation Primera was launched in the end of 1995 in Japan, and in the autumn of 1996 in Europe. Unique in its class, the new Primera featured multi link beam rear suspension with multi-link front suspension.

As before, in Europe the Primera was sold with 1.6 L and 2.0 L petrol engines and a 2.0 L diesel, with hatchback, saloon and estate bodystyles. While the estate was now based on the Primera's platform, it was assigned a model code of WP11.

The hatchback assembled in the United Kingdom was available only with the SR20DE engine and automatic transmission and began production from November 1997, a captive import known as the Primera UK GT. Estate began production from September 1997.

Alongside the original Primera, the Nissan Primera Camino was launched as a badge engineered model for different dealer networks. 

The models for Japan also introduced a CVT automatic transmission during the P11 series, including a six-speed tiptronic version in the M6 G-V and Autech edition wagons and Te-V saloon. The Te-V was equipped with SR20VE and CVT M6 transmissions only.

Nissan continued selling the Primera in the United States as the Infiniti G20 from 1998 until 2002, when it was replaced by a rebadged version of the Nissan Skyline V35 as the Infiniti G35. The G20 used the same grille and rear lamp alterations from the Primera Camino.

In 1998, Nissan New Zealand released a limited edition Primera SMX with association with Steve Millen (Stillen Sports Parts). Features include cross drilled brakes, Eibach springs and a more aggressive body kit. There were a total of 26 (including the prototype numbered 000) made in five colour choices (the prototype was the only white one made).

This was because until 1998 (due to lifting of import tariffs on cars) Nissan had an automotive assembly operation in New Zealand, and for a short time between 1997 and 1998 the P11 Primera was assembled in Wiri, Auckland. The locally assembled models were all fitted with the  SR20DE engine and were available in four different trim levels: S, SE, SES, and SEL. The Japanese-made Primeras which replaced it received the one-piece chrome grille (from the Primera Camino) and US-style taillights; the new trim levels were GX and GXE.

The Primera won the British Touring Car Championship manufacturer's and team titles thanks to RML in 1998 and 1999 with backing from the factory, as well as the Independents' Cup in 1999 and 2000.

To celebrate the two victories in 1998, Nissan UK released a limited edition of 400 GTSE models, with 16" AZEV alloy wheels, two tone "flip" ChromaFlair "Mystic" green paint, following the special theme to the interior which featured full leather seating with green piping seats, steering wheel and a Momo gearknob.

To celebrate the 1999 "clean sweep", they released a limited edition GTLE model with 16" multi spoke Enkei alloy wheels, a full leather interior with silver piping, a Momo gearknob and a colour choice of Flame Red, Kuro Black, Starburst Silver, and Nordic Blue.

Facelift
In August 1999, Nissan gave the Primera a facelift, giving it a more modern front end with clear style headlamps featuring projector units, instead of the traditional Fresnel lens type. Nissan also introduced their "corporate identity" front, with the "flying wing" grille. The new code name for this model was "P11-144".

Along with the exterior changes, improved specification levels were present; with the entry level models such as the "S" featuring automatic climate control, driver, passenger, and side airbags. Further up the model range, other features were seen such as xenon headlamps.

A new "lean burn" 1.8 L petrol engine, the QG18DE was added to the range. This facelift was not generally applied outside Europe and was not available in Japan when Nissan "formalized" the fronts of other Primeras and Caminos instead, bringing them into line with the look of the American model of Infiniti. Production ended in June 2002.

STCC Edition
The Primera STCC Edition (named for the Swedish Touring Car Championship) is a limited production model based on the Primera Sport. One hundred examples were made. It had the same engine as the Primera Sport, but it was lowered , had headlight "goggles" and had a bigger wing.

Third generation (P12; 2001)

Nissan introduced the third generation Primera in Japan on January 30, 2001, its first all new car since the alliance with Renault was formed two years earlier. The new Primera was more radically styled than previous versions. No Infiniti equivalent was released; the Skyline-based Infiniti G35 replaced the G20 in the United States. The third generation Primera made its European debut at the 2001 Frankfurt Motor Show.

New Zealand Primeras were introduced in 2002, and were all equipped with continuously variable transmissions; there was no manual option. Originally, Japanese-built sedans and wagons were available in New Zealand. This remained true until 2006, when liftbacks and estates assembled in the United Kingdom became available instead. The CVT is also available in the European 2.0 L and the Japanese-made 2.0 and 2.5 L versions (the larger engine was not available in Europe).

Falling sales caused the Primera to be withdrawn from sale in the United Kingdom in November 2006. Production of left-hand drive cars, however, continued until 2007. In Japan, production of RHD Primeras also continued until 2007. In 2011, a large number of brand new Primeras appeared in the market in Ireland, after apparently having been in storage since 2006.

The 2.0 L six-speed manual Nissan Primera 20V has Nissan's SR20VE Neo VVL engine with variable valve lift and timing.

Replacement
Speculation in the motoring press suggested that a "tweaked" version of the Nissan Altima would be the replacement, but this did not happen. In August 2006, Auto Express reported pictures of a disguised, Sentra-based prototype testing in Germany. 

However, it was actually the new Nissan Sentra, which was built in Spain rather than at Sunderland for European buyers. Such was the success of the Nissan Qashqai crossover in Europe, that Nissan did not launch a direct replacement for the Primera, despite earlier plans for such a model to be developed for at least some markets in Europe.

References

External links

 Official British site
 Nissan Primera 20V (Japan)

Primera
Cars introduced in 1990
2000s cars
Mid-size cars
Sedans
Hatchbacks
Station wagons
Police vehicles
Vehicles with CVT transmission
Euro NCAP large family cars
Cars discontinued in 2008